Alberto Rebecca (born 30 May 1985 in Montebelluna) is an Italian football player who plays for GSD Ambrosiana.

External links
  Career on Tuttocalciatori.net
 Career on Aic.football.it

1985 births
Living people
People from Montebelluna
Italian footballers
Association football forwards
Venezia F.C. players
A.S.D. Sangiovannese 1927 players
Botev Plovdiv players
Italian expatriates in Bulgaria
First Professional Football League (Bulgaria) players
Expatriate footballers in Bulgaria
Association football midfielders
Sportspeople from the Province of Treviso
Footballers from Veneto